The Prince of Atlantis is a British children's traditional-CGI animated television series about a group of underwater creatures who protect the oceans.

Synopsis
In the heart of the ocean, in the mysterious waters of the Bermuda Triangle, is a beautiful city built by the legendary people of Atlantis. Its sole inhabitant is a child, the prince Akata, the last of the Atlanteans. With him in the underwater city lies all the knowledge, technology and the extraordinary powers accumulated by the people for 5000 years. But modern technologies threaten the city: men with sophisticated machinery plumb the depths of the ocean in order to extract its riches. Akata, with the help of the hologram of his master, Shum, and the ray-like mermaid Oya, must protect the Atlantean heritage, particularly the Blue Ray, from falling into the wrong hands.

Broadcast
It premiered on the BBC as part of their children's block CBBC and originally aired from 7 January to 1 April 1997 and later for further more episodes from 25 June to 10 September of the same year running for only 26 episodes. After the series was cancelled, it continued to air on the BBC until 2003. It also later aired on The Children's Channel on cable television and was broadcast in several countries worldwide such as TV2 in New Zealand, SRF zwei in Switzerland as well as various other German and Austrian channels such as Nickelodeon, ProSieben, Junior and ORF eins, 8TV (originally called MetroVision) in Malaysia, Univision in America as part of La Piñata Loca, Bahrain Channel 55 in Bahrain, Channel 5 in Singapore, Sjónvarpið in Iceland, M-Net in South Africa with the series being shown on their programming block for children called K-T.V., Canal 5 in Mexico and RTÉ2 in the Republic of Ireland as part of their children's block The Den and on military television on BFBS and its former network SSVC being shown on both of their children's wrapper programmes Room 785 and Children's SSVC in some countries such as Germany and the Falkland Islands.

Response
In July 2002 the series was the most watched programme on CBBC that week, with 70,000 viewers.

Episodes

References

External links
 LE PRINCE D'ATLANTIS - Episode Listing
 Le prince d'Atlantis - Episode Guide
 AnimeKa - Prince d'Atlantis (Le) (1997)
 Planete Jeunesse - Le Prince d'Atlantis

1997 British television series debuts
1997 British television series endings
1990s British animated television series
BBC children's television shows
British computer-animated television series
British children's animated action television series
British children's animated adventure television series
British children's animated drama television series
British children's animated science fantasy television series
Fictional Atlanteans
Atlantis in fiction
TVNZ 2 original programming